Seven Kingdoms are an American power metal band from DeLand, Florida. The band was formed in DeLand in 2007 by guitarist Camden Cruz and vocalist Bryan Edwards, after they parted with their previous band, This Solemn Vow. The band has shifted lineups repeatedly, and currently includes guitarists Cruz and Kevin Byrd, drummer Keith Byrd, vocalist Sabrina Valentine, and bassist Aaron Sluss.

The band, in an early lineup, recorded their independent debut album, Brothers of the Night, in late 2007. The album was heavily inspired by the writings of fantasy novelist George R. R. Martin. Their second album, Seven Kingdoms, featuring the current lineup, was released by Nightmare Recordings in July 2010.

Since their formation, the band has played several shows throughout the United States and Canada, including international showcase ProgPower USA in Atlanta (September 2010).

History 
Camden Cruz and Bryan Edwards formed the band in 2007. The next two members to join were brothers Kevin and Keith Byrd on guitars and drums, respectively. Rounding out the group were John Zambrotto on keyboards, and Cory Stene playing bass. Edwards obtained several possible band names from novelist George R. R. Martin's epic fantasy series A Song of Ice and Fire, and the band members chose the name Seven Kingdoms. In August 2007 they recorded their debut album, Brothers of the Night, at Morrisound Studios in Temple Terrace, Florida. The album, heavily influenced by Martin's novels, was released independently in November 2007.

For the next year they toured throughout Florida in support of the album. In January 2008, they replaced Aghora at Florida's Hellstock event. In May 2008 they played at The Maximum Metal Show in St. Petersburg, Florida.

In early 2009 the band moved in a new direction in preparation for its second album. During the writing of the album, the band ultimately decided that keyboards were not going to be featured, and Zambrotto was released. Edwards and Stene soon left as well. Miles Neff became the new bassist and Sabrina Valentine became the new vocalist. The second album, Seven Kingdoms, was recorded at Morrisound Studios in September 2009. In November 2009 the band signed a worldwide booking and management deal with Intromental Management. They opened for heavy metal band W.A.S.P. at Club Firestone in Orlando, Florida in March 2010.

In April 2010, Seven Kingdoms signed a worldwide deal with Nightmare Records for their second album. That month they were the subject of an interview on Beach 92.7 radio and played SwordFest with Cage. Their second album, Seven Kingdoms, was released in July 2010. It contained 11 songs and featured an appearance by Crimson Glory / Leatherwolf singer Wade Black. Seven Kingdoms played at ProgPower USA in September 2010, opening the Midweek Mayhem event. That month they parted ways with bassist Miles Neff, who was replaced by Aaron Sluss. They entered regular rotation at Epic Rock Radio.com in October 2010. In November they began The Sacred Worlds and Songs Divine tour, opening for Blind Guardian and Holy Grail. They also played at Florida Powerfest II, a festival organized by guitarist Camden Cruz, on December 18, 2010. In 2011 they played the Uniting the Powers of Metal Tour along the eastern seaboard along with Artizen, Widow and Creation's End. In March and April 2013, the band played in Europe for the first time, touring with Amaranthe and Stratovarius, across 13 countries.

Discography

Brothers of the Night (2007) 

Brothers of the Night was released independently in 2007. A number of forums devoted to the musical genre received the album well. The Metal Crypt commented that "Power Metal fans who like some meat on their music should get into this." Imhotep said that the band had "come to unite in metal brotherhood with honor and glory." After listening to the album, Metalrage opined that, "It’s only a matter of time until Nuclear Blast decides to turn this young band into a fully grown metal act."

Seven Kingdoms (2010) 

Seven Kingdoms was released in 2010 on Nightmare Records. When reviewing the new CD, Seven Kingdoms, Marc Gromen, of the Metal Temple, and also of Brave Words and Bloody Knuckles, had a fair review. He stated that it is "...Good to hear this style of music emanating from North America, even better that a domestic label is giving it a home. Certainly one to watch." When reviewing the new CD, Several genre sites also had favorable opinions to share. The music review site Imhotep said metal fans should "…March gallantly to your nearest store, mail order or Seven Kingdoms show as this album contains what most expect out of their epic, progressive power metal." Additionally, the site Metal Revolution also shared good review of the band's newest offering. They believe that it's a must buy"...For fans of bands such as Sonata Arctica, Iced Earth, Nightwish there is definitely something  on this album you cannot go without. Visit the websites below for a taste and order your copy, this would not be a choice to regret."

The Fire is Mine (2012) 
This album was just released on October 9, 2012 and is available for purchase on the Nightmare Records website.

In the Walls EP (2016) 
This EP was released on September 30, 2016.

Decennium (2017) 
This album was released on May 5, 2017.

Zenith (2022) 
This album was released on June 17th, 2022.

Discography 
 Brothers of the Night (Album, 2007, self released)
 Seven Kingdoms (Album, 2010, Nightmare Records)
 The Fire is Mine (Album, 2012, Nightmare Records)
 In the Walls (EP, 2016, self released)
 Decennium (Album, 2017, Napalm Records)
 Empty Eyes (EP, 2019, self released)
 Zenith (Album, 2022, Distortion Music Group)

References

External links 
 Nightmare Records.com
 Power Of Metal - webzine - Denmark

2007 establishments in Florida
American power metal musical groups
American thrash metal musical groups
Articles containing video clips
Musical groups from Florida
Musical groups established in 2007